Nihat Zeybekci (born 1 January 1961) is a Turkish economist, politician, a member of parliament for Denizli Province of the ruling Justice and Development Party (AKP) and former Minister of the Economy.

Early life
Nihat Zeybekci was born to Şükrü and Fatma Zeybekci as the youngest of five children in the village of Pınarlar in Tavas district of Denizli Province on 1 January 1961. The family earned their living from tobacco farming, and Nihat helped his parents in his youth.

After studying Business Administration at Marmara University, he received his master's degree in International Relations from Istanbul University. He also claimed to have conducted further studies in economics at South London College in the United Kingdom, but he removed this information from his official resume after it turned out to be false.

He is married and has four children.

Career

Profession
Zeybekci served as executive for companies in Istanbul and Denizli. In 1994, he founded a textile company. He was elected into the Denizli Chamber of Industry and chaired two terms Denizli Textile and Apparel Exporters' Association.

Politics
Zeybekci entered politics at regional level. In the 2004 local elections, he was elected Mayor of Denizli from the Justice and Development Party. He was re-elected to the post in the 2009 local elections. In 2011, he resigned to run for a seat in the parliament. During this time, he represented his city and country in some organizations for regional administrations at national and international level.

He was elected into the Grand National Assembly of Turkey in the 2011 general election as an MP from Denizli Province. On 26 December 2013, Nihat Zeybekci assumed office as the Minister of Economic Affairs, succeeding Zafer Çağlayan during Prime Minister Erdoğan's cabinet reshuffle with ten new names that was announced the day before, on 25 December, following the 2013 corruption scandal in Turkey.

He is considered as a close friend of Erdoğan, who spends his summer holidays together with Zeybekci.

References

1961 births
People from Tavas
Marmara University alumni
Istanbul University alumni
Turkish economists
Justice and Development Party (Turkey) politicians
Deputies of Denizli
Ministers of Economic Affairs of Turkey
Living people
Mayors of places in Turkey
Mayors of Denizli
Members of the 25th Parliament of Turkey
Members of the 24th Parliament of Turkey
Members of the 63rd government of Turkey
Members of the 26th Parliament of Turkey
Members of the 65th government of Turkey